The Copa del Generalísimo 1943 Final was the 41st final of the King's Cup. The final was played at Estadio Metropolitano in Madrid, on 20 June 1943, being won by Club Atlético de Bilbao, who beat Real Madrid CF 1–0 after extra-time.

Details

See also
El Viejo Clásico

References

1943
Copa
Athletic Bilbao matches
Real Madrid CF matches